Romedi Spada (8 March 1925 – 30 July 2004) was a Swiss alpine skier. He competed in the men's downhill at the 1948 Winter Olympics.

References

External links
 

1925 births
2004 deaths
Swiss male alpine skiers
Olympic alpine skiers of Switzerland
Alpine skiers at the 1948 Winter Olympics
Sportspeople from Graubünden